The Gitxaała Nation is a First Nations government located in the village of Lach Klan (also called Kitkatla on Canadian maps), in the North Coast region of the Canadian province of British Columbia.

Governance 
The Gitxaała Nation has a Governing Council consisting of seven elected members and a Hereditary Table (Na hali Txooxgm sayt wan Sm'gygyet). The Governing Council is responsible for the administration of programs and services such as housing, public works and health services. The Hereditary Table serves an advisory role to the Governing Council and decides on the distribution of resources and territory.

Governing Council members

See also 
 Kitkatla (band)

References

External links 
 Official website of the Gitxaala Nation

Tsimshian governments
North Coast of British Columbia